Lucky Luke is a Western bande dessinée series created by Belgian cartoonist Morris in 1946. Morris wrote and drew the series single-handedly until 1955, after which he started collaborating with French writer René Goscinny. Their partnership lasted until Goscinny's death in 1977. Afterwards, Morris used several other writers until his own death in 2001. Since Morris's death, French artist Achdé has drawn the series, scripted by several successive writers.

The series takes place in the American Old West of the United States. It stars the titular Lucky Luke, a street-smart gunslinger known as the "man who shoots faster than his shadow", and his intelligent horse Jolly Jumper. Lucky Luke is pitted against various villains, either fictional or inspired by American history or folklore. The most famous of these are the Dalton Brothers, loosely based on the Dalton Gang of the early 1890s and claimed to be their cousins. The stories are filled with humorous elements parodying the Western genre.

Lucky Luke is one of the best-known and best-selling comics series in Europe. It has been translated into 23 languages. 82 albums have appeared in the series as of 2022, and 3 special editions/homages, at first published by Dupuis. From 1968 to 1998 they were published by Dargaud and then by Lucky Productions. Since 2000 they have been published by Lucky Comics. Each story was first serialized in a magazine: in Spirou from 1946 to 1967, in Pilote from 1968 to 1973, in Lucky Luke in 1974–75, in the French edition of Tintin in 1975–76, and in various other magazines since.

The series has also had adaptations in other media, such as animated films and television series, live-action films, video games, toys, and board games. As of 2022, all 82 books in the series' regular albums are available in English.

Publication history

Simultaneously a tribute to the mythic Old West and an affectionate parody, the comics were created by Belgian artist Morris, who drew Lucky Luke from 1946 until his death in 2001. The first Lucky Luke adventure, Arizona 1880, appeared in the French version of the Franco-Belgian comics magazine Spirou in December 1946. It later appeared in the Almanach issue of Spirou on 7 December 1946.

After several years of writing the strip himself, Morris began a collaboration with René Goscinny. He was the series writer during what is considered its golden age, starting with the story , published on 25 August 1955 in Spirou, until his death in 1977 (with the exception of ). Ending a long run of serial publications in Spirou, the series was shifted to Goscinny's Pilote magazine in 1967 with the story . Later it was taken to Dargaud publisher.

After the death of Goscinny in 1977, several writers succeeded him: including Raymond "Vicq" Antoine, Bob de Groot, Jean Léturgie and Lo Hartog van Banda. At the 1993 Angoulême International Comics Festival, Lucky Luke was given an honorary exhibition.
 
After Morris' death in 2001, French artist Achdé continued drawing new Lucky Luke stories in collaboration with writers Laurent Gerra, Daniel Pennac and Tonino Benacquista. Since 2016, new albums are scripted by writer Jul.

Lucky Luke comics have been translated into: Afrikaans, Arabic, Bengali, Catalan, Croatian, Czech, Danish, Dutch, English, Estonian, Finnish, German, Greek, Hebrew, Hungarian, Icelandic, Indonesian, Italian, Norwegian, Persian, Polish, Portuguese, Serbian, Slovene, Spanish, Swedish, Tamil, Turkish, Vietnamese and Welsh.

The stories

Overview
Although always described as a cowboy, Luke generally acts as a righter of wrongs or bodyguard of some sort, where he excels thanks to his on-hand resourcefulness and incredible gun prowess. A recurring task is that of capturing the bumbling but menacing gangsters the Dalton brothers, Joe, William, Jack and Averell. He rides Jolly Jumper, "the smartest horse in the world" and is often accompanied by prison guard dog Rin Tin Can, "the stupidest dog in the universe", a spoof of Rin Tin Tin.

Luke meets many historical Western figures such as Calamity Jane, Billy the Kid, Judge Roy Bean and Jesse James's gang, and takes part in events such as the guarding of Wells Fargo stagecoaches, the Pony Express, the building of the First Transcontinental Telegraph, the Rush into the Unassigned Lands of Oklahoma, and a tour by French actress Sarah Bernhardt. Some of the books feature a one-page article on the background to the events featured. Goscinny once said that he and Morris tried to base the Lucky Luke adventures on real events whenever possible, but that they would not let the facts get in the way of a funny story.

The chronology of the albums is deliberately murky, and in most albums no particular year is given. The villains and incidental characters based on real persons lived over most of the mid-to-late-19th century. For example, in the album Daily Star, Lucky Luke meets a young Horace Greeley, prior to his moving to New York in 1831. Judge Roy Bean, who was appointed judge in 1882, appears in another album, and in another album yet, Lucky Luke takes part in the 1892 Coffeyville shootout against the Dalton gang. Lucky Luke himself appears unchanged in all stories.

Except in the first few stories, where he shoots and kills Mad Jim and the old Dalton brothers gang in Coffeyville, Luke is never seen to kill anyone, preferring to disarm people by simply shooting weapons out of their hands.

Phil Defer was killed in the first publication in Le Moustique, but in the later album collection, this was changed into a debilitating shoulder wound.

In the final panel of each story, except the earliest, Lucky Luke rides off alone on Jolly Jumper into the sunset, singing (in English) "I'm a poor lonesome cowboy, and a long way from home...".

Historical figures who have appeared in Lucky Luke

Smoking controversy
Morris, who had been criticized over Lucky Luke's cigarette for a long time, answered his critics: "the cigarette is part of the character's profile, just like the pipe of Popeye or Maigret". It is claimed that Morris was forced to remove cigarettes Lucky Luke smokes from his strip and Lucky Luke who "used to be a heavy smoker", had to give up smoking for "commercial reasons", apparently to "gain access to the American market".

Morris received an award from the World Health Organization in 1988 for replacing Luke's omnipresent cigarette with a wisp of straw in the story Fingers (1983).
In the 2007 animated film Tous à l'Ouest: Une aventure de Lucky Luke, Lucky Luke is seen using what appears to be a nicotine patch and mentions that before that he had to "chew on a piece of straw for a while" right after he quit smoking. In the 1994 story Le Pont sur le Mississippi (The Bridge Over the Mississippi), he is seen rolling a cigarette again, although he claims it was just to hide his boredom. And in Sarah Bernhardt (1982), when Bernhardt's cook lights a fire to make a cake, despite Luke's strict orders not to, Luke is seen rolling a cigarette in an irate mood. He then strikes a match, only for it to be blown out by Jolly Jumper, who reminds him of his own "no fire" orders.

Spin-off series 
A spin-off series called Rantanplan starring Luke's dimwitted canine sidekick began in 1987. It has been written over the years by several successive teams of writers and artists. The character also got a 76-episode animated television series in 2006.

A second spin-off series called Kid Lucky was designed in 1995, aimed at attracting a younger readership. This starred Luke as a little boy, a format that had been very popular with Spirou. Two albums starring this version of the character were released as part of the main series: Kid Lucky and Oklahoma Jim. These were credited to veteran writer Jean Léturgie and unknown artist Pearce, who was later revealed to be a joint pen name for Yann Lepennetier and Didier Conrad. The series was scrapped due to poor sales and the two albums removed from the official list of Lucky Luke albums. The series was however re-launched in 2011 as Les aventures de Kid Lucky d'après Morris, with Achdé now solely in charge of it. To date, Achdé has written four Kid Lucky albums, L'apprenti Cow-boy, Lasso périlleux, Statue Squaw and Suivez la flèche, released in 2011, 2013, 2015 and 2017, respectively. In June 2020, It was announced Kid Lucky will be adapted into an animated series.

Collected editions

By Morris (1949–1958)

Dupuis Publishing

By Morris & Goscinny (1955–1977)

Dupuis Publishing

Dargaud Publishing

Between Le Fil qui chante and La Corde du pendu is La Ballade des Dalton, 1978 (The Daltons' Ballad or The Ballad of the Daltons), an adaptation from the animated film.

By Morris and various writers (1980–2002)

Dargaud Publishing

Lucky Productions

Lucky Comics

By Achdé and various writers (since 2004)

Lucky Comics

Kid Lucky spin-off
 , 2011 (Cowboy in Training)
 , 2013 (The Dangerous Lasso)
 Statue Squaw, 2015
 , 2017 (Follow the Arrow)
 , 2019 (Kid or Double)

Special editions and homages
, 2016, by Matthieu Bonhomme (The Man Who Shot Lucky Luke)
 , 2017, by Guillaume Bouzard (Jolly Jumper Stops Responding)
 , 2019, by Mawil (Lucky Luke Saddles Up)
Lucky Luke: Wanted, 2021, by Matthieu Bonhomme (Wanted Lucky Luke)
, 2021, by Ralf König (Swiss Bliss).

English translations
Apart from the collections mentioned below, Lucky Luke comics were published in British comic book magazines such as Film Fun Comic or Giggle (in 1967). The Giggle version had Luke's name changed to "Buck Bingo".

Brockhampton Press Ltd, Leicester, began publishing the books in hardcover and softcover, with six titles from 1972 to 1974, translated by Frederick W Nolan. Brockhampton became part of Hodder & Stoughton Ltd in 1976, and under their children's imprint, Knight Books, Hodder published mini-sized paperback editions of the first six books, in 1976 to 1977. In 1980 and 1982, Hodder & Stoughton published three new titles as Hodder Dargaud, as well as reprints of the previous six.

Cinebook Ltd have been publishing English language translations of Lucky Luke in softcover album format since 2006. One new volume is released every two months. In India only, Euro Books, a division of Euro Kids International Ltd. published English versions of 24 Lucky Luke titles in 2009.

In 2019 Cinebook began releasing a hardcover collection of Lucky Luke, published in chronological order featuring three to four original albums per volume together with a vast amount of extras included, titled Lucky Luke – The Complete Collection.

Cinebook also published translations of the two Matthieu Bonhomme homages: Wanted Lucky Luke (2016) and The Man Who Shot Lucky Luke (2021).

List of single albums in English

Brockhampton Press (UK)

Jesse James, 1972
The Stagecoach, 1972
Dalton City, 1973
The Tenderfoot, 1974
Western Circus, 1974
Apache Canyon, 1974

Knight Books (UK)

The Stagecoach, 1976
Dalton City, 1976
Jesse James, 1976
The Tenderfoot, 1976
Apache Canyon, 1977
Western Circus, 1977

Hodder Dargaud (UK)

Ma Dalton, 1980
Curing the Daltons, 1982
The Dashing White Cowboy, 1982

Dargaud USA and Canada

The Stage Coach, US, 1980s
The Greenhorn, US, 1980s
Dalton City, US, 1980s
Jesse James, US, 1980s
Western Circus, US, 1980s
Ma Dalton, US, 1980sThe Dalton Brothers' Analyst, Canada, 1982Curing the Daltons, Canada, 1982

Fantasy Flight (US)The Stage Coach, 1990sJesse James, 1990s

Ravette Books (UK)The Dalton Brothers Memory Game, 1991

Glo'worm (UK)Calamity Jane, 1998Dalton City, 1998Ma Dalton, 1999Jesse James, 1998The Tenderfoot, 1999Western Circus, 2000The Dashing White Cowboy, 2000

Cinebook Ltd

 Billy The Kid, 2006, 
 Ghost Town, 2006, 
 Dalton City, 2006, 
 Jesse James, 2006, 
 In the Shadow of the Derricks, 2007, 
 Ma Dalton, 2007, 
 Barbed Wire on the Prairie, 2007, 
 Calamity Jane, 2007, 
 The Wagon Train, 2008, 
 Tortillas for the Daltons, 2008, 
 Western Circus, 2008, 
 The Rivals of Painful Gulch, 2008, 
 The Tenderfoot, 2008, 
 The Dashing White Cowboy, 2008, 
 The Daltons in the Blizzard, 2009, 
 The Black Hills, 2009, 
 Apache Canyon, 2009, 
 The Escort, 2009, 
 On the Daltons' Trail, 2009, 
 The Oklahoma Land Rush, 2009, 
 The 20th Cavalry, 2010, 
 Emperor Smith, 2010, 
 A Cure for the Daltons, 2010, 
 The Judge, 2010, 
 The Stagecoach, 2010, 
 The Bounty Hunter, 2010, 
 Lucky Luke versus Joss Jamon, 2011, 
 The Dalton Cousins, 2011, 
 The Grand Duke, 2011, 
 The Daltons' Escape, 2011, 
 Lucky Luke versus the Pinkertons, 2011, 
 Rails on the Prairie, 2011, 
 The One-Armed Bandit, 2012, 
 The Daltons Always On The Run, 2012, 
 The Singing Wire, 2012, 
 The Daltons Redeem Themselves, 2012, 
 Fingers, 2012, 
 Doc Doxey's Elixir, 2012, 
 The Man from Washington, 2013, 
 Phil Wire, 2013, 
 The Daily Star, 2013, 
 Lone Riders, 2013, 
 The Bluefeet are coming!, 2013, 
 Lucky Luke versus Pat Poker, 2013, 
 Tying the Knot, 2014, 
 The Pony Express, 2014, 
 Outlaws, 2014, 
 Dick Digger's Gold Mine, 2014, 
 The Daltons' Amnesia, 2014, 
 Seven Stories, 2014, 
 The Painter, 2015, 
 The Beautiful Province, 2015, 
 Nitroglycerin, 2015, 
 Rodeo, 2015, 
 Arizona, 2015, 
 Under a Western Sky, 2015, 
 Legends of the West, 2016, 
 The Daltons' Stash, 2016, 
 Bride of Lucky Luke, 2016, 
 The Ballad of the Daltons and other stories, 2016, 
 Daisy Town, 2016, 
 The Cursed Ranch, 2016, 
 Sarah Bernhardt, 2017, 
 The Wedding Crashers, 2017, 
 Ghost Hunt, 2017, 
 The Promised Land, 2017, 
 Belle Starr, 2018, 
 Bridge Over the Mississippi, 2018, 
 Kid Lucky, 2018, 
 The O.K. Corral, 2018, 
 A Cowboy in Paris, 2018, 
 Marcel Dalton, 2019, 
 The Prophet, 2019, 
 The Klondike, 2020, 
 Rin Tin Can's Inheritance, 2020, 
 Oklahoma Jim, 2020, 
 A Cowboy in High Cotton, 2020, 
 The Dalton Uncles, 2021, 
 Steaming up the Mississippi, 2021, 
 The Alibi, 2021, 
 The Hanged Man's Rope and Other Stories, 2022, 
 Rin Tin Can's Ark, 2022, 

Eurokids (India)

 The Alibi, 2009, 
 Ghost Hunt, 2009, 
 Kid Lucky, 2009, 
 Oklahoma Jim, 2009, 
 The Prophet, 2009, 
 Belle Star, 2009, 
 The Klondike, 2009, 
 The Pony Express, 2009, 
 Sarah Bernardt, 2009, 
 The bridge on the Mississippi, 2009, 
 The Hanged Man’s Rope and other stories, 2009, 
 The Ballad of the Daltons and other stories, 2009, 
 Daisy Town, 2009, 
 Fingers, 2009, 
 Marcel Dalton, 2009, 
 The Artist, 2009, 
 The legend of the west, 2009, 
 The Daily Star, 2009, 
 Lucky Luke's fiancé, 2009, 
 Nitroglycerine, 2009, 
 The Cursed Ranch, 2009, 
 The Beautiful Province, 2009, 
 From the Gallows to the Altar, 2009, 
 The Dalton’s Loot, 2009, 

Europe Comics

 The Man Who Shot Lucky Luke, 2016 
 Cowboy in Training, 2017
 Dangerous Lasso, 2017
 Statue Squaw, 2017
 Follow the Arrow, 2019

Lucky Luke in other media

Films
Animation
Goscinny directed and co-produced two animated Lucky Luke films: Daisy Town (1971)
 (1978)
The French company Xilam produced a theatrical animated film: Go West! A Lucky Luke Adventure (5 December 2007)

Live-action
There are a number of feature adaptations from various countries, including:
Turkish films:
 (1970), starring Izzet Günay
 (1975), starring Sadri Alışık
Italian films, both starring Terence Hill:Lucky Luke (1991)Lucky Luke 2 (1991)
French films, both produced by Saïd Ben Saïd and Yves Marmion:
 (2004), featuring Til Schweiger as Lucky Luke (one of the most expensive European films ever made)Lucky Luke (2009), starring French actor Jean Dujardin as Lucky Luke
Iranian films:The Return of Lucky Luke (2015), featuring Siavash Kheirabi as Lucky Luke

Television
In 1983, Hanna-Barbera Productions, France 3, Gaumont Film Company, Extrafilm Berlin and Morris collaborated to release the animated TV series Lucky Luke which ran for 26 episodes, based on original album stories. The series' main voice actors were William Callaway as Lucky Luke, Robert Ridgely as Jolly Jumper, Paul Reubens as Bushwack, Frank Welker as Joe Dalton, Rick Dees as Jack Dalton, Fred Travalena as William Dalton, Bob Holt as Averell Dalton, and Mitzi McCall as Ma Dalton. Additional voices were provided by Peter Cullen, Pat Fraley, Barbara Goodson, and Mona Marshall. Notably, an episode of H-B's The Huckleberry Hound Show featured Huck as an Old West Sheriff attempting to capture a separate Dalton family (named Dirty, Dangerous, Detestable, Desperate, Despicable, Dastardly and Dinky)

In 1990, a new animated series of 26 episodes was produced by IDDH, with the collaboration of Morris, based on album stories not adapted in the prior series.

The 1992 live-action Italian television series, Lucky Luke, also known as The Adventures of Lucky Luke, was based on the films of the previous year, and again starred Terence Hill.

In 2001, Xilam produced the 52-episode animated series  (The New Adventures of Lucky Luke). It was made available on an eight-disc DVD set with French and English audio tracks. This series also featured Colonel Custer who in this incarnation is an Indian-hater and a dwarf. Unlike the two earlier animated series, this series featured original stories.

Mediatoon Distribution produced Kid Lucky (2020).

Video games
Over the years, several Lucky Luke video games have been released for many platforms, most of them by Infogrames, and only released in Europe (the only ones released for the North American market were the Game Boy Color and PlayStation versions).

A Lucky Luke game was also developed for mobile phones by The Mighty Troglodytes. Lucky Luke: Go West was released in Europe for the PC, Nintendo Wii and Nintendo DS in the end of 2007.

In 2013, French publishers Dupuis and Anuman Interactive announced the development of a new Time Management game: Lucky Luke: Transcontinental Railroad (set in the 1860s) on PC, Mac, iOS and Android.

 Lucky Luke – Tiger Handheld – 1984
 Lucky Luke: Nitroglycerine – Coktel Vision, Commodore 64, Amstrad CPC, Atari ST, MS-DOS, Thomson TO – 1987
 Lucky Luke: The Video Game – Philips Interactive, Philips CD-i – 1996
 Lucky Luke – Infogrames, Game Boy (Europe only) – 1996 and Game Boy Color - May 1999
 Lucky Luke – SNES and PC (Europe Only) – October 1997
 Lucky Luke – Infogrames, PlayStation – 1998 and Windows (Europe only) – 2000 as Lucky Luke: On the Dalton's Trail Lucky Luke: Desperado Train – Game Boy Color (Europe Only) – 2000 (Infogrames)
 Lucky Luke: Western Fever – PC and PlayStation (Europe only) – 2001
 Lucky Luke: Wanted! – Game Boy Advance (Europe only) – 11 February 2001 (Infogrames)
 Go West! A Lucky Luke Adventure – DS, PC, Wii – 2007

Tributes to Lucky Luke

In the Belgian Comic Strip Center in Brussels the permanent exhibition brings homage to the pioneers of Belgian comics, among them Morris. In the room dedicated to his work the entry has saloon doors and Luke's shadow can be seen on the floor and on the wall.

In 1992, as part of Brussels' Comic Book Route, a wall in the Rue de la Buandrie/ Washuisstraat in Brussels was dedicated to Lucky Luke. It was designed by D. Vandegeerde and G. Oreopoulos.

Since 2007 the Rue des Pierres/ Steenstraat in Brussels has a commemorative plaque with the name  /  placed under the actual street sign.

In Charleroi, Belgium, a statue of Lucky Luke can be seen in Astrid Park. The nearby Charleroi Metro station Parc is also decorated with scenes of Lucky Luke.

They were designed by Luc Madou.

In 1993, French rapper MC Solaar released his song  with references to Lucky Luke and the Daltons.

In the 2010 Obsidian Entertainment developed and Bethesda Softworks published Fallout: New Vegas. Posters appear in the game, as well as in some loading screens, stating "There's a new sheriff in town and he's looking for deputies ... Become a part of the human dignity bloc". Accompanying this text is an image of a frontier-era sheriff doing a finger gun motion with both hands. Aside from the star-shaped sheriff badge he wears, the sheriff is dressed identically to Lucky Luke, sporting his trademark white hat, yellow shirt, black vest, and red bandana tied around his neck.

In 2015, Danish reggaeton band Camilo & Grande released a single titled "Lucky Luke", in which they liken their lives to that of Lucky Luke.

In 2022, the Belgian government included a tribute to Lucky Luke in the visa pages of its newly redesigned passport. It features a blank silhouette of Luke and Jolly Jumper in Monument Valley, with the full detail of the characters being revealed under UV light.

See also
Brussels' Comic Book Route
Cocco Bill

Notes

References

 Lucky Luke publications in Spirou and Pilote BDoubliées 

Further reading
 Lefevre, Pascal. 1998. Lucky Luke, a 'lonesome cowboy' for more than half a century. In The Low Countries, 1998–1999. Rekkem: Stichting Ons Erfdeel.

External links

 Lucky Luke official site 
 English publisher of Lucky Luke - Cinebook Ltd
 Lucky Luke English publications
 
 In Brussels, a wall is dedicated to Lucky Luke''.
 German editions of Lucky Luke
 Goscinny website on Lucky Luke 
 Euro Book's Lucky Luke 24 Albums Set (2009)
 Cine Books Lucky Luke #1-10 Albums Set (2008)
 Tara Press's Lucky Luke 5 Albums Set (2007)

 
1946 comics debuts
1946 establishments in Belgium
American children's animated action television series
American children's animated adventure television series
Belgian comics adapted into films
Belgian comics characters
Belgian comic strips
Belgian comics titles
Comics adapted into animated films
Comics adapted into animated series
Comics adapted into television series
Comics adapted into video games
Comics by Morris (cartoonist)
Comics characters introduced in 1946
Comics set in the 19th century
Fictional orphans
French children's animated action television series
French children's animated adventure television series
Humor comics
Male characters in comics
Parody comics
Western (genre) comics
Western (genre) gunfighters